Tenfield is a broadcasting corporation which holds the commercial rights to broadcast the Uruguayan football and basketball. It was founded in 1998 by the Uruguayan business-men Francisco "Paco" Casal, and the former football players Enzo Francescoli and Nelson Gutiérrez with the objective of broadcasting the Uruguayan football league system.

It also owns Spanish-language soccer network GOL TV, which it purchased in April 2007.

Sporting events

Football 
 Uruguayan Primera División (not available on ESPN+ Argentina) (Four Games per Matchday live on VTV or VTV 2 and tape-delay on GOLTV)
 Uruguayan Segunda División (Two Games per Matchday live on VTV or VTV Two).
 Uruguayan Tercera División (One Game per matchday live on VTV or VTV Two)
 Argentine Primera División (only available for Uruguay) (six matches per round on VTV or GolTV)
 2014 FIFA World Cup qualification (CONMEBOL) (only available for Uruguay) (all matches live on VTV and VTV Plus).
 UEFA Euro (only available for Uruguay).
 Copa América (only available for Uruguay).
 FIFA World Cup (32 matches are broadcast live on VTV and VTV Plus) (Only Available for Uruguay).
 Uruguay national football team internacional friendly matches of home and away
 International friendly matches.
 VTV Sports Cup
 Rio de Janeiro State Championship
 São Paulo State Championship

Tennis 
 Davis Cup

Basketball 
 Uruguayan Basketball League
 NBA
 FIBA Americas Championship (only available for Uruguay)

Cycling 
 Rutas de América

Futsal 
 Liga Nacional de Futsal (only available for Uruguay)

Handball 
 Uruguayan League

Motor Sports 
 Uruguayan Rally,
 Formula One, (Only 9 races that are broadcast live on VTV and tape-delay on VTV Plus)

Special events 
 Summer Olympic Games
 Pan American Games
 Uruguayan Carnival

Original Programming in co-production with Tenfield

Televisión 
 Pasión Fútbol (Presented by Sergio Gorzy, Juan Carlos Scelza, Martin Charquero and Alberto Kesman) (Sunday at 22:00 on VTV)
 K-Pos (Monday at 10:00 pm on VTV)
 Sin Límite (Presented by Javier Máximo Goñi) (Monday to Friday at 18:00 live on VTV Plus)
 RR GOL (Presented by Rodrigo Romano) (Monday at 21:00 on VTV Plus)
 El Ascenso (Presented by Marcos Vitette) (Tuesday at 23:00 on VTV Plus)
 Cámara Celeste
 Pasión Básquetbol (Friday at 22:00 on VTV Two)
 Pasión Voleibol (Friday at 22:00 on VTV Two)
 Pasión Handbol
 Pasión Rugby
 Pasión Futsal

External links 
 Tenfield Official Site

Television companies of Uruguay
Spanish-language television stations
Television channels and stations established in 1998
Mass media in Montevideo